is a former Japanese football player. She played for Japan national team.

Club career
Baba was born in Tokyo on May 4, 1977. She played for Nippon TV Beleza from 1994 to 2006.

National team
On August 3, 2001, Baba debuted for Japan national team against South Korea. She played 5 games for Japan until 2002.

National team statistics

References

External links

1977 births
Living people
Association football people from Tokyo
Japanese women's footballers
Japan women's international footballers
Nadeshiko League players
Nippon TV Tokyo Verdy Beleza players
Women's association football defenders